Garry Anthony Fraser is a Scottish BAFTA-award winning film director and producer. 
Garry was the second unit director in the hit film "T2:Trainspotting 2"

References

Date of birth missing (living people)
Living people
Scottish film producers
Scottish film directors
British documentary film directors
Year of birth missing (living people)